Valeriu Jurcă (born 8 April 1939) is a Romanian sprinter. He competed in the men's 200 metres at the 1964 Summer Olympics.

References

1939 births
Living people
Athletes (track and field) at the 1964 Summer Olympics
Romanian male sprinters
Romanian male hurdlers
Olympic athletes of Romania
Place of birth missing (living people)